Faust is a 1994 live-action/animated film directed and written by Jan Švankmajer. An international co-production between the Czech Republic, France, the United Kingdom, the United States and Germany, the film merges live-action footage with stop-motion animation, including puppetry and claymation.

Produced by Jaromír Kallista, the film does not relate the legend of Faustus accurately according to the original, instead borrowing and blending elements from the 1808 story as told by Goethe and c. 1598-1592 by Christopher Marlowe with traditional folk renditions. It has elements of modernism and absurdism, and has a Kafkaesque atmosphere, enhanced by being set in Prague, and the tone is dark but humorous. The film was selected as the Czech entry for the Best Foreign Language Film at the 67th Academy Awards, but was not accepted as a nominee.

Plot
The story begins on the streets of Prague on a grey morning busy with commuters. A colourless figure (Petr Čepek) emerges from a metro station. On his way home, the man encounters two men handing out flyers. It is a map of the city with a location marked. He shrugs and discards it, returning to his lodging. As he opens the door, a black cockerel runs out. The man sits down to eat, cutting himself a slice of bread. He discovers an egg concealed inside the loaf. He cracks it open but it is empty. Suddenly the lights go out and the wind rises. Objects are thrown about the room. The commotion ceases; the man goes to the window and looks down to where the two men from earlier are staring up at him. One of them holds the cockerel. The man closes the blind and returns to the table, where he finds the map and, using his own map of the city, traces out the location marked.

The next day, he goes to the spot indicated and enters a dilapidated building just as a man rushes from it in fear. He continues into the interior and descends to a dressing room, where he finds a charred script, a robe embroidered with sigils, greasepaint, a wig with a beard and a cap. Sitting down, he addresses himself as "Faust" and speaks to himself (the first words spoken in the film) Faust's opening declaration of intent to follow black magic.

As the opening curtain is signalled, Faust finds himself on a stage, a performance about to begin. Ripping off his costume, he breaks through the stage backdrop into a vault where an alchemist's laboratory is revealed; with the aid of a book of spells, he brings to life a clay child which grows horrifyingly into his own image before he smashes it. Warned by a marionette angel not to experiment further but encouraged by a demon to do as he pleases, he is sent by a wooden messenger to a café meeting with the two street-map men, identified as "Cornelius" and "Valdes", who give him a briefcase of magical devices. Returning to the vault, he uses these to summon Mephisto, offering Lucifer his soul in return for 24 years of self-indulgence.

At another café, Faust is entertained by Cornelius and Valdes, who provide a fountain of wine from a table-top. He watches as a tramp, carrying a severed human leg, is pestered by a large black dog until he throws the limb into the river. Faust finds a key in his food, uses it on a shop-front shutter, and is dragged back on stage by waiting stagehands. He mimes a scene from Gounod's opera, in which Mephisto returns and the pact with Lucifer is signed in blood. After the interval, Faust visits Portugal to demonstrate his supernatural powers to the King: when a requested restaging of the David and Goliath contest is poorly received, he drowns the entire Portuguese court.

Faust is distracted from repentance by Helen of Troy, whom he seduces before realising she is a wooden demon in disguise. Lucifer arrives earlier than expected to claim his soul, and Faust rushes in panic from the theatre, meeting a newcomer in at the doorway as he bursts into the street. He is felled by a red car, and Cornelius and Valdes watch in amusement as a tramp carries away a severed leg from the scene of the accident. A policeman checks the car, but it is without a driver.

Cast 
 Petr Čepek – Faust
 Jan Kraus – Cornelius
 Vladimír Kudla – Waldes
 Antonin Zacpal – Old man
 Jiří Suchý – Kašpar
 Andrew Sachs - All voices in the English dub

Reception 
Faust received positive reviews from critics. On review aggregator website Rotten Tomatoes, it has a 73% score based on 11 reviews, with an average rating of 6.80/10.

Accolades 
The film was screened at the Un Certain Regard section of the 1994 Cannes Film Festival, and at the 4th Kecskemét Animation Film Festival where it won the Award of Adult Audience. It also won the Czech Critics Award for Best Animated Film, and three Czech Lions, while it was nominated for four more. At the 29th Karlovy Vary International Film Festival, it was nominated for the Crystal Globe and won the Special Jury Prize.

See also
 List of submissions to the 67th Academy Awards for Best Foreign Language Film
 List of Czech submissions for the Academy Award for Best Foreign Language Film

References

External links
 
 
 

1994 films
Czech animated films
French animated films
1990s black comedy films
British animated films
American animated films
German animated films
1990s Czech-language films
1994 fantasy films
Films based on Goethe's Faust
Films directed by Jan Švankmajer
Films with live action and animation
1990s stop-motion animated films
Films set in Prague
Surrealist films
Czech Lion Awards winners (films)
1994 animated films
1990s French animated films
1994 comedy films
1990s American films
1990s British films
1990s French films
1990s German films
Czech animated fantasy films
Czech animated drama films